Husemann is a surname of German origin, being a variant of the surname Hausmann, which originated as an occupational surname for a servant or administrator who worked at a great house. Notable people with the surname include:

Fritz Husemann (1873-1935), German trade union leader and politician
Marta Husemann (1913-1960), German actor and resistance fighter
Walter Husemann (1909-1943), German communist and resistance fighter
Werner Husemann (1919-2014), German night fighter ace

See also
Hausmann
Huseman